Christopher Michael Langan (born March 25, 1952) is an American horse rancher and autodidact who has been reported to score very highly on IQ tests. Langan's IQ was estimated on ABC's 20/20 to be between 195 and 210, and in 1999 he was described by some journalists as "the smartest man in America" or "in the world".

Biography
Langan was born in 1952 in San Francisco, California. His mother, Mary Langan-Hansen (née Chappelle, 1932–2014), was the daughter of a wealthy shipping executive but was cut off from her family.  Langan's biological father left before he was born, and is said to have died in Mexico. Langan's mother married three more times, and had a son by each husband.  Her second husband was murdered, and her third died by suicide. Langan grew up with the fourth husband Jack Langan, who has been described as a "failed journalist" who went on drinking sprees and disappeared from the house, locked the kitchen cabinets so the four boys could not get to the food in them and used a bullwhip as a disciplinary measure. The family was very poor; Langan recalls that they all had only one set of clothes each.  The family moved around, living for a while in a teepee on an Indian reservation, then later in Virginia City, Nevada. When the children were in grade school, the family moved to Bozeman, Montana, where Langan spent most of his childhood.

During elementary school, Langan repeatedly skipped grades, and was bullied by his peers. He claims to have been beaten by his stepfather, Jack Langan, who denies this. At age 12, Langan began weight training, which he says was motivated by the desire to fight back against bullies. He eventually ejected his stepfather from the household.

Langan attended high school, but spent his last years engaged mostly in independent study. He did so after his teachers denied his request for more challenging material. According to Langan, he began  teaching himself "advanced math, physics, philosophy, Latin, and Greek". According to Cynthia McFadden from ABC's 20/20, he earned a perfect score on the SAT (pre-1995 scale) despite taking a nap during the test.

Langan was offered two full scholarships, one to Reed College in Oregon and the other to the University of Chicago. He chose the former, which he later called "a big mistake". He had a "real case of culture shock" in the unfamiliar urban setting. He lost his scholarship after his mother did not send in the necessary financial information. Langan returned to Bozeman and worked as a Forest Service firefighter for 18 months before enrolling at Montana State University–Bozeman. Faced with financial and transportation problems, and believing that he could teach his professors more than they could teach him, he dropped out. He took a string of labor-intensive jobs for some time, and by his mid-40s had been a construction worker, cowboy, Forest Service Ranger, farmhand, and, for over twenty years, a bouncer on Long Island. He also worked for the technology company Virtual Logistix.

In comparing the lack of academic and life success of Langan to the successes of Robert Oppenheimer, journalist Malcolm Gladwell, in his 2008 book Outliers, points to the background and social skills of the two men. Oppenheimer was raised in a wealthy cosmopolitan neighborhood in Manhattan. His father was a successful businessman and his mother was an artist, he was educated at the Ethical Culture School and summered in Europe, and studied at Harvard University and subsequently started a PhD at Cambridge University. Gladwell points to an illustrating example: when Oppenheimer tried to poison his tutor at Cambridge, he used his social savvy and his parents used their influence to have Oppenheimer merely sent for psychiatric help without any criminal or academic consequences; in contrast, when Langan's mother missed a deadline for financial aid, Langan lost his scholarship and when Langan tried to convince college administration at Reed College to switch a class to a later time (owing to a broken down car) his request was denied. Langan grew up in poverty and had an unsettled early life filled with abuse, which created a resentment of authority which Gladwell reported Langan still carried during his interview decades after his academic hardships. He had had little or no guidance from his parents or his teachers, and never developed the social skills needed to cope with and overcome his challenges.

In 1999, Langan and others formed a non-profit corporation named the Mega Foundation for those with IQs of 164 or above. In 2004, Langan moved with his wife Gina, a clinical neuropsychologist, to northern Missouri, where he owns and operates a horse ranch and undertakes activities for his Mega Foundation.

In 2008, he appeared on the game show 1 vs. 100 and won $250,000.

Cognitive-Theoretic Model of the Universe
Langan has developed an idea he calls the "Cognitive-Theoretic Model of the Universe" (CTMU) which he maintains "explains the connection between mind and reality, therefore the presence of cognition and universe in the same phrase". He calls his proposal "a true 'Theory of Everything', a cross between John Archibald Wheeler's 'Participatory Universe' and Stephen Hawking's 'Imaginary Time' theory of cosmology" additionally contending that with CTMU he "can prove the existence of God, the soul and an afterlife, using mathematics." Even so, Langan does not belong to any religious denomination, explaining that he "can't afford to let logical approach to theology be prejudiced by religious dogma".

Views
Langan's support of conspiracy theories, including the 9/11 Truther movement (Langan has claimed that the George W. Bush administration staged the 9/11 attacks in order to distract the public from learning about the CTMU) and the white genocide conspiracy theory, as well as his opposition to interracial relationships, have contributed to his gaining a following among members of the alt-right and others on the far right. Journalists have described certain of Langan's Internet posts as containing "thinly veiled" antisemitism and making antisemitic "dog whistles".

References

External links
Cognitive-Theoretic Model of the Universe website

1952 births
American conspiracy theorists
American spiritualists
Fellows of the International Society for Complexity, Information, and Design
Living people
People from Princeton, Missouri
People from San Francisco
Philosophical cosmologists
Philosophical theists
Reed College alumni
Montana State University alumni